Sukhyi Estuary, or Sukhyi Lyman ( - dried estuary), is on open estuary in the north-western Black Sea, near the cities of Odesa and Chornomorsk, Ukraine.
In 1957 the estuary was connected to the sea via 14-m depth navigation canal, therefore the water body de facto transformed to the marine bay. Upper site of the estuary is more shallow, up to 1.5 m depth. Northern and western parts are separated by artificial dam and transformed to fresh water ponds. The Dalnyk River inflows to the estuary.

The modern name, "Dry Estuary", the water body have got in the time when it was isolated from the Black Sea. That time the estuary dried regularly, sometime up to 1 km² area. The name of the water body is given by German colonists. The upper part of the estuary is located in two valleys:
 Kleinliebenthal, "Small valley of love". The main part of the estuary is located in this valley. The Dalnyk River inflows in this part. On the coast is a village Malodolynske (old name is Kleinliebenthal).
 Großliebenthal, "Grand valley of love". In this valley is a bay, the Akkarzhanka River inflows in which. On the coast is a village Velykodolynske (old name is Großliebenthal).

The estuary is a place of spawning and feeding of fish, such as flounder, gobies (the grass goby is most numerous), sand-smelts, mullets.

References

 Starushenko L.I., Bushuyev S.G. (2001) Prichernomorskiye limany Odeschiny i ih rybohoziaystvennoye znacheniye. Astroprint, Odesa, 151 pp. (in Russian)
 North-western Black Sea: biology and ecology, Eds.: Y.P. Zaitsev, B.G. Aleksandrov, G.G. Minicheva, Naukova Dumka, Kyiv, 2006, 701 pp.

Gallery

See also
 Berezan Estuary
 Tylihul Estuary
 Khadzhibey Estuary
 Dniester Estuary
 Small Adzhalyk Estuary

Estuaries of the Black Sea
Estuaries of Ukraine
Landforms of Odesa Oblast